Pumpkin Center is an unincorporated community in Tangipahoa Parish, Louisiana, United States. Pumpkin Center is located on U.S. Route 190, west of Hammond.

Name origin
In the late 1800s a popular vaudeville comedy show called "Tales of Pun'kin Centre" was distributed as a phonograph record and later broadcast over radio featuring a monologue by a fictional character named Uncle Josh Weathersby. The character resided in a fictional farming town called "Pun'kin Center." The village had no name at that time and some of the young men formed a baseball team to compete with the surrounding Hammond, Springfield and Albany teams. The team members named themselves the "Pumpkin Center" baseball team. Over time the residents of the surrounding cities and villages began referring to the area as Pumpkin Center and the name stuck.

References

Unincorporated communities in Tangipahoa Parish, Louisiana
Unincorporated communities in Louisiana